Ervin Pëllumb Fakaj (born 15 June 1976) is an Albanian retired professional footballer who played as a centre-back. He made 25 appearances and scored one goal for the Albania national team.

Club career
Born in Vlorë, Fakaj had spells in Spain, Cyprus and Germany, before ending up in Belgium with Racing Genk, where he lined up alongside Besnik Hasi.

International career
Fakaj made his debut for the Albania national team in an August 1995 friendly match away against Malta and earned a total of 25 caps, scoring one goal. His final international was an October 2002  European Championship qualification match against Russia in Volgograd.

Career statistics

References

External links
 

1976 births
Living people
Footballers from Vlorë
Albanian footballers
Association football central defenders
Albania international footballers
Segunda División B players
2. Bundesliga players
Belgian Pro League players
Cypriot First Division players
Flamurtari Vlorë players
CD Toledo players
Eintracht Nordhorn players
Hannover 96 players
SV Meppen players
Enosis Neon Paralimni FC players
K.R.C. Genk players
MSV Duisburg players
KF Tirana players
FK Partizani Tirana players
Albanian expatriate footballers
Expatriate footballers in Spain
Albanian expatriate sportspeople in Spain
Expatriate footballers in Germany
Albanian expatriate sportspeople in Germany
Expatriate footballers in Cyprus
Albanian expatriate sportspeople in Cyprus
Expatriate footballers in Belgium
Albanian expatriate sportspeople in Belgium